Forevermore was a 2014 Philippine romantic drama television series directed by Cathy Garcia-Molina, starring Enrique Gil and Liza Soberano, together with an ensemble cast. The series was aired on ABS-CBN and worldwide on The Filipino Channel from October 27, 2014, to May 22, 2015, replacing Ikaw Lamang.

This is the story of Xander (Enrique Gil), the rebellious and broken unica hijo of a hotel magnate; and Agnes (Liza Soberano), the humble and hardworking daughter of a strawberry farmer in Benguet. Both cross paths when Xander crashes into Agnes's strawberry truck while base jumping. After the incident, his parents make him pay for the damages and his recklessness by having him work in the strawberry farm without any comfortable amenities, under the guidance of Agnes and her strawberry farm community. The journey towards Xander's immersion in a totally different world was not easy for both. However, eventually, Xander, with the help of Agnes and their community, will transform from a brash, broken boy to a very charming man loved by everyone.

The series ended with a total number of 148 episodes.

Series overview

Episodes

Book 1

Book 2

References

External links
 

Lists of Philippine drama television series episodes